Mahac Nuriddinovun (born 15 December 1977) is an Azerbaijani boxer. He competed in the men's lightweight event at the 2000 Summer Olympics.

References

1977 births
Living people
Azerbaijani male boxers
Olympic boxers of Azerbaijan
Boxers at the 2000 Summer Olympics
Place of birth missing (living people)
Lightweight boxers
20th-century Azerbaijani people
21st-century Azerbaijani people